Eekhout Abbey was a medieval house of Augustinian Canons in Bruges, West Flanders, Belgium.

History
The origin of the abbey, dedicated to Saint Bartholomew, was traditionally linked to the religious community that had grown up round the cell of the hermit Everelmus in about 1050, although the first reference dates only from 1130.

In or around 1146 it joined the Arrouaisian Order, and in consequence adopted the Rule of St. Augustine and became an abbey, under the first abbot, Lambertus. The men's and women's communities which had previously coexisted here were separated:  the women were moved to premises in Odegem (now Steenbrugge) where their community developed into St. Trudo's Abbey (still extant and housed since 1954 in Male Castle), while the men remained on the existing site near the centre of Bruges.

After centuries of decline, the abbey was dissolved in the French Revolution.

Dispersal
In 1803, after being sold off as state property, the abbey was entirely demolished by its French purchaser Rousseau, except for a single doorway onto the Eekhoutstraat, which still stands. Isolated plots which were connected to their property in the Garenmarkt came into the hands of the Du Jardin family. After the failure of their family business, the Bank Du Jardin, in 1874 a large part of their property here came into the possession of the Sisters of the Sint-Andreasinstituut, who had a school built on it. The site of the former abbey is now occupied by the Groeningemuseum.

References

Bibliography
 Bossuyt, S, 2003: De eremiet Everelmus en de stichting van de Eeckhoutabdij te Brugge (ca. 1052-1150). Bruges: Handelingen van het Genootschap voor Geschiedenis te Brugge 140, pp.179-201
 Huyghebaert, N.N., 1970: Abbaye de Saint-Trond à Odegem, Bruges et Male in Monasticon Belge, IV, dl. 4, Liège, pp. 1028-1031

Christian monasteries in West Flanders
Augustinian monasteries in Belgium
Demolished buildings and structures in Belgium
Former buildings and structures in Belgium
Buildings and structures in Bruges
Buildings and structures demolished in 1803